Popscene was a UK "indie dance" club of the 1990 Brit Pop movement.  .

History 

The founders of Popscene were Dave McCarthy and Mac Be who were the promoters and DJs for its entire run. "It was myself and Dave at first, then Dave's girlfriend Jenny started doing a bit in the later years before we parted company in May 2000," Be explained on a dedicated fan forum.

The pair had previously run "Happy," a successful, pre-Britpop night at The Clapham Grand for the Mean Fiddler organisation.  "Happy" featured the first major live London appearances by bands such as The Verve, and was contained within a club night structure along the lines of the acid house 'PA' appearance model.

In 1994 the owners of the Astoria in London's Charing Cross Road asked the duo to produce Friday nights at the LA2 club within the Astoria complex. The club's opening night featured free entry, leading to a capacity crowd. Under a strict policy of "no live bands," the club went on to run with weekly capacity crowds for the next five years. The club attracted more than 300,000 customers over its lifespan; hours-long entry queues of hundreds of people were common. Popscene's DJ sets laid the foundations for the rock/dance crossover of the next decade; the tagline on many of the distinctive (and now highly collectable) flyers was "the dance club for people who like bands".

Popscene's name originates from the single by Blur. It became synonymous with the Britpop movement along with retro-themed rival Blow Up. Members of bands popular within the scene, such as Oasis, Blur, and Manic Street Preachers, were regular customers at both clubs. Popscene deliberately avoided a separate VIP area and made a selling point of the fact that everyone was equal once inside the doors. “Sophie Ellis-Bextor came up to me and went, ‘I’m going to be a singer, I just sung Noel Gallagher ‘Wonderwall’ and he thought it was fantastic’” McCarthy recalled in an interview with DJ Mag.

The night was also notable for the DJs taking centre stage in the venue. The DJ's accessibility led to patrons taking to the stage and dancing onstage alongside the DJ decks. In response, the club developed a special "flying decks" set-up suspended from the in-house lighting rig.

The Evening Standard magazine wrote "man, the crowd is fun. Deep into the night I watch the tasty-looking throng go mental"  and the mid-Nineties UK MTV Magazine summed up the atmosphere when they wrote "cigarettes, alcohol and lots of snogging are the order of the night". Time Out called Popscene "the indie superclub with an altogether hipper vibe" and "UK Club Guide" described it as "a thriving, begging for it happy crowd." They continued, stating: "It's the busiest indie club in the country." As Popscene developed over its five-year lifespan it was cited as one of the major breakthrough clubs in London (together with the Heavenly Social) for the Big beat music genre in the latter part of the decade. The Guardian Weekend Magazine declared it was "now deemed cooler than the heavenly jukebox."

Amongst many other notable achievements, the DJ duo of McCarthy and Be were the first successful UK club DJs to move from vinyl to CD, gave Erol Alkan his first opportunity to play to large crowds, and McCarthy was the first London club DJ to play what became known as bootleg/mash-up tracks with cut-ups he made using the first available editions of Acid sound production software in 1999. The club was also host to the first ever public playback of the third Oasis album Be Here Now in the world.

In 2004 BBC Radio London's mid-morning DJ Robert Elms asked his audience which clubs had been the culturally most important to his listeners each and every caller cited Popscene as the defining London club of the era 

In the Summer of 2007, a sellout revival of Popscene was held in the original venue without the involvement of founder McCarthy, who had gone onto forge a subsequent career as acclaimed DJ producer IDC.

See also

List of electronic dance music venues

References

Nightclubs in London
Defunct nightclubs in the United Kingdom
Music venues completed in 1995
1995 establishments in England
Electronic dance music venues